The Sub Carpathians of Curvature, Ciucaș, or Curvature Carpathians, are located between the Trotuș and Slănic rivers in Romania. They are a range of high hills (800–900 m), with knolls and parallel ridges (Măgura Odobești), which separate two geological depressions.

The Sub Carpathians are one of the three traditional classifications of the Eastern Carpathians in Romania:  
 In the north, the Carpathians of Maramureș and Bucovina (Munții Carpaţi ai Maramureșului și Bucovinei).
 In the center, the Carpathians of Moldavia and Transylvania (Munții Carpați Moldo-Transilvani).
 In the south, the Curvature Carpathians (Munții Carpați de Curbură).

They include:  
 Bârsa Mountains (Munții Bârsei)
 Ciucaș Mountains (Munții Ciucaș)
 Buzău Mountains (Munții Buzăului)
 Vrancea Mountains (Munții Vrancei)
 Baiu Mountains (Munții Baiului or Munții Gârbova)
 Brașov Depression (Depresiunea Brașovului)

Geologically, based on the divisions of the Carpathians, all of the Sub Carpathians are part of the Outer Eastern Carpathians.

See also
 Romanian Carpathians

External links

Mountain ranges of Romania
Mountain ranges of the Eastern Carpathians